Hey Boy! Hey Girl! is a 1959 American musical film directed by David Lowell Rich. It stars Louis Prima and Keely Smith.

Cast
 Louis Prima as himself
 Keely Smith as Dorothy Spencer
 James Gregory as Father Burton
 Henry Slate as Marty Moran
 Kim Charney as Buzz

References

External links
 

1959 films
1959 musical films
American black-and-white films
American musical films
Films directed by David Lowell Rich
Columbia Pictures films
1950s English-language films
1950s American films